I'll Be There for You is the twelfth studio album by KC and the Sunshine Band, released in 2001. The album followed eight years after their previous studio album.

Track listing
"When I Close My Eyes" (Pete Masitti) – 4:14
"Higher Love" – 3:44
"Wanna Be Your Lover" (Casey, Masitti) – 4:12
"All That Good Stuff" – 3:52
"Get Up Off Your Love" – 3:57
"All I Really Wanna Do" (Casey, David Cabrera, Curtis Williams) – 3:49
"Down Again" – 4:31
"Come Back" – 4:45
"Party Zone" (Casey, Masitti, Carlos Sarli) – 3:25
"When It Comes to Love" – 3:45
"I'll Be There for You" (Casey, Cabrera) – 3:32
"All That Good Stuff" (Latin Remix) – 5:10
"Higher Love" (Latin Remix) – 4:08
"I'll Be There for You" (Remix) (Casey, Cabrera) – 4:54

All songs were written by Harry Wayne Casey, except where noted.

Personnel
Harry Wayne Casey – keyboards, vocal
Pete Masitti – keyboards, drum programming, background vocal
Curtis Williams – keyboards
David Cabrera – guitar
Ralph Hunter – drums
Carlos Sarli – drum programming, background vocal
Fermin Goytisolo – percussion
Ivan Palma – percussion
Mark Jenkins – steel drums
William Spencer – trumpet
Brian MacDonald – trumpet
Joel Behrman – trombone
John Turros – saxophone
Mike Scaglione – saxophone
Alex Dean – saxophone
John Di Puccio – violin
Bruce Wethy – violin
MeiMei Lou – violin
Huifang Cher – violin
Laslo Pap – violin
D. Chappell – violin
Debra Spring – violin
Jill Clark – French horn
P. Lakofsky – cello
Robert Moore – cello
Maria DeCrescenzo – background vocals
Donna Allen – background vocals
Diane Williams (DeDe Wild) – background vocals
Tessie Porter – background vocals

KC and the Sunshine Band albums
2001 albums